Brühl is a town in the Rhineland, Germany. It is located in the district of Rhine-Erft, 20 km south of the Cologne city center and at the edge of the Rhineland Nature Park, a famous nature reserve.

History

Brühl received its town privileges in 1285. From 1567 on, the city of Brühl was the official residence of the Prince Bishops of Cologne. In the 18th century the Prince Bishop Clemens August replaced a former ruined castle and built the Augustusburg and Falkenlust palaces near the city center. Today, both are listed as UNESCO World Heritage Sites because of their outstanding rococo architecture. Until 1990 Augustusburg Palace was used by the federal government to receive foreign heads of states visiting West Germany.

Main sights

 The amusement park Phantasialand
 The Max Ernst Museum, opened in 2005. It displays sculptures and paintings of the surrealistic artist Max Ernst (who was born in Brühl) and other modern art.
 Local history and pottery are shown in two small museums in the city centre

Infrastructure
Brühl station is on the Left Rhine line and the nearby Kierberg station is on the Eifel railway. Brühl also has several stops on line 18 of the Cologne tram line.

Notable people 

 Else Schmitt (1921–1995), politician (SPD) and a district mayor in Cologne
 Erika Reihlen (born 1936), theologian and former president of the German Protestant Church Day
 Hans Leyendecker (born 1949), journalist
 Heinz-Josef Kehr (1950–2014), footballer
 Helmut Müller-Brühl (1933–2012), conductor and initiator of the Brühler Schlosskonzerte at the Augustusburg Palace
 Josef Engel (1922–1978), historian
 Max Ernst (1891–1976), painter and sculptor
 Patric Hemgesberg (born 1973), lyricist
 Reiner Calmund (born 1948), football coach and former manager of Bayer 04 Leverkusen
 Wolfgang Streeck (born 1946), sociologist

Twin towns – sister cities

Brühl is twinned with:
 Chalcis, Greece
 Kaş, Turkey
 Kunice, Poland
 Royal Leamington Spa, England, United Kingdom
 Sceaux, France
 Weißwasser, Germany

Gallery

References

External links

  
 Max Ernst Museum
 Brühler Museumsinsel
 Phantasialand theme park

Towns in North Rhine-Westphalia
Rhein-Erft-Kreis